Anninskaya is a rural locality (a village) in Staronadezhdinsky Selsoviet, Blagoveshchensky District, Bashkortostan, Russia. The population was 4 as of 2010. There is 1 street.

Geography 
Anninskaya is located 58 km northeast of Blagoveshchensk (the district's administrative centre) by road.

References 

Rural localities in Blagoveshchensky District